Pterolophia tuberculatrix is a species of beetle in the family Cerambycidae. It was described by Johan Christian Fabricius in 1781. It contains the varietas Pterolophia tuberculatrix var. obsoleta.

References

tuberculatrix
Beetles described in 1781